Toghan-Shah Abu Bakr (d. 1185 or 1186) was the amir of Nishapur from 1174 until his death.

Biography

Toghan-Shah was the son of Mu'ayyid al-Din Ai-Aba and succeeded him in 1174 when the latter was captured and executed while fighting in Khwarezm. Trouble for him appeared with the arrival in Khurasan of the exiled Khwarezmshah Sultan Shah. With a contingent of Qara Khitai troops, Sultan Shah established a power base in Khurasan and soon turned on Toghan-Shah. The latter was incapable of withstanding Sultan Shah's attacks, and as a result he lost Tus to him in 1181.

For the rest of Toghan-Shah's reign he continued to suffer from Sultan Shah's raids. Attempts to enlist support against him from Tekish, the current Khwarezmshah, or from the Ghurids, who had given him a princess in marriage, were unsuccessful. In 1185 or 1186 he died and left his realm to his son, Sanjar-Shah.

Notes

References
Bosworth, C.E. "The Political and Dynastic History of the Iranian World (A.D. 1000-1217)." The Cambridge History of Iran, Volume 5: The Saljuq and Mongol Periods. Edited by J.A. Boyle. Great Britain: Cambridge University Press, 1968. 

Turkic rulers
Amirs of Nishapur
1180s deaths
Year of death uncertain
Year of birth unknown